The  is an archaeological site containing the ruins of a Jōmon period cave dwelling located in what is now part of the town of Takahata, Yamagata in the Tōhoku region of northern Japan. The site was designated a National Historic Site of Japan in 1983.

Overview
The site consists of two natural caves which are located in on a tuff cliff on the southern slope of Mount Daishimori. The caves were discovered in 1960 and excavated from 1961 to 1963. The cave was found to contain stratified cultural layers indicating settlement from the early Jōmon period through the Kofun periods. Numerous examples of Jōmon earthenware in various styles, including ridge line and pressed decoration varieties were found.

The site is one of several similar cave dwelling sites which have been found in the vicinity. It is located approximately 30 minutes by car from Takahata Station on the Yamagata Shinkansen.

See also
List of Historic Sites of Japan (Yamagata)
Hinata Caves
Ōdachi Caves

References

External links
Takahata city official site 

Jōmon period
History of Yamagata Prefecture
Takahata, Yamagata
Archaeological sites in Japan
Historic Sites of Japan